Number One is an unincorporated community located in Wayne County, Kentucky, United States.

References

Unincorporated communities in Wayne County, Kentucky
Unincorporated communities in Kentucky